Pontus Skule Erik Almqvist (born 10 July 1999) is a Swedish professional footballer who plays for Polish club Pogoń Szczecin. He is also signed to Russian club Rostov, but that contract is suspended. He is deployed as a winger (most often on the right side) or centre-forward.

Career
After attending trials in Stockholm, Almqvist joined the Nike Football Academy before signing a professional contract with Norrköping for the 2017 season. On 23 September 2017, he made his debut for Norrköping, playing the last ten minutes in a 2–1 loss to Halmstads. He spent part of the 2017 season loan at Division 2 side IF Sylvia where he played three games and scored one goal. He joined Varbergs BoIS on loan at the start of the 2018 season and played four times before returning to Norrköping in July 2018.
He scored his first two goals for Sweden U21 in September 2020 

On 15 October 2020, Almqvist signed a five-year contract with Russian Premier League club Rostov. On 7 March 2022, FIFA introduced special regulations related to the Russian invasion of Ukraine. Those regulations allow foreign players in Russia to unilaterally temporarily suspend their contracts with their Russian clubs until the end of the 2021–22 season and join clubs outside of Russia until that date. On 17 March 2022, Almqvist used the new rule to sign with FC Utrecht in the Netherlands until the end of the 2021–22 season.

FIFA extended their regulations for the 2022–23 season, allowing Almqvist to join Polish side Pogoń Szczecin on a one-year loan spell on 5 July 2022.

Career statistics

References

External links 
 
 
 

1999 births
People from Nyköping Municipality
Sportspeople from Södermanland County
Living people
Swedish footballers
Sweden youth international footballers
Sweden under-21 international footballers
Association football midfielders
Nike Academy players
IFK Norrköping players
IF Sylvia players
Varbergs BoIS players
Norrby IF players
FC Rostov players
FC Utrecht players
Pogoń Szczecin players
Allsvenskan players
Superettan players
Ettan Fotboll players
Division 2 (Swedish football) players
Russian Premier League players
Eredivisie players
Swedish expatriate footballers
Expatriate footballers in England
Swedish expatriate sportspeople in England
Expatriate footballers in Russia
Swedish expatriate sportspeople in Russia
Expatriate footballers in the Netherlands
Swedish expatriate sportspeople in the Netherlands
Expatriate footballers in Poland
Swedish expatriate sportspeople in Poland